Liz Peek (born January 10, 1949) is an American right-wing commentator and business analyst on the finance industry and government.

Education
Peek graduated as a Durant scholar from Wellesley College with an Honors Degree.

Career
Peek spent more than 20 years on Wall Street as a research analyst focused on the oil industry. She began working for Wertheim & Company in 1975 and in 1983, was one of the first women to become partner at a Wall Street investment firm.  She left Wall Street in 1990 to raise her children, but remained active as a commentator.  She has written for The Fiscal Times, Fox News, the New York Sun, The Wall Street Journal, Alternate Universe, the Motley Fool, and Women on the Web and has appeared on Fox Business with Neil Cavuto and Fox & Friends.

Peek was the first woman elected president of the National Association of Petroleum Investment Analysts and was also a member of Institute of Chartered Financial Analysts.

In August 2012, she was named chair of the Board of Trustees of the Fashion Institute of Technology (FIT), a college in the State University of New York system. In February 2013, was awarded the statuette of a spool of thread award by FIT's Couture Council.

Peek is also the executive vice president of the board of Women's Committee of the Central Park Conservancy and served as a board and executive committee member of the School of American Ballet. She is also chairperson of the fundraising organization for The Museum at FIT and member of the board of the FIT Foundation.

Personal life
Liz Peek and her husband Jeff Peek, former CEO of CIT Group, have three children.

References

Living people
American commentators
American philanthropists
Wellesley College alumni
1949 births
CFA charterholders